Sabrina Latreche (born 30 July 1993) is an Algerian chess player.

She has been a Woman International Master (WIM) since 2011
She won the African championship under 16 years in South Africa 2009
She was part of the Algerian team which won the team gold medal in All Arab games 2011 in Qatar 
She was the winner of the 2014 and 2016 Women's Arab Chess Championship, and 2018 Arab chess championship blitz.

She won the Algerian Women's chess championship five times: in 2011 and four times in a row from 2015 to 2018.

She represented Algeria at seven Olympiads from 2006 to 2018.

She won a gold medal for the second board at Chess at the 2011 All-Africa Games, and was part of the Algerian team which won the team silver medal.

She played in the Women's World Chess Championship 2017 and she is qualified for the Women's World Chess Championship 2020

External links 
 
 
 report on 2011 All-Africa Games

1993 births
Living people
Algerian female chess players
Chess Woman International Masters
African Games gold medalists for Algeria
African Games medalists in chess
African Games silver medalists for Algeria
Competitors at the 2011 All-Africa Games
Competitors at the 2019 African Games
African Games bronze medalists for Algeria
21st-century Algerian women
20th-century Algerian women